Martin Šonka (born 26 March 1978 in Dvůr Králové nad Labem) is a Czech aerobatics (unlimited) and a former fighter pilot in the Czech Air Force. He has raced in Red Bull Air Race World Championship since 2010, becoming the World Champion in the 2018 Red Bull Air Race World Championship season.

Biography

Beginnings 
Martin Šonka began his aviation career in 1997. In this year he flew a glider for the first time and started his studies at University of Defence in Brno as a pilot. In 1999 he gained his Private Pilot Licence. Between 2001 and 2005 he attended Jan Perner Transport Faculty at University of Pardubice (Department of Transport Management, Marketing and Logistics). He finished his studies with a master's degree in 2005.

The Czech Air Force 
His military career started in 2000 in Pardubice. Two years after he moved to the air base in Náměšť nad Oslavou and in 2006 to 21st Tactical Air Force Base at Čáslav where he began flying L-159 Alca. In 2012 he has finished the type rating for the Saab JAS 39 Gripen. In 2014 he was forced to leave the army due to his busy racing schedule.

Aerobatics 
In 2005 he became a member of the Czech national aerobatic team. He used to fly Su-31, however in the past few years he is training and competing with Extra 300SR.

Red Bull Air Race 
In 2009 Šonka passed all Red Bull Air Race qualifying camps and gained The Red Bull Air Race Super Licence. Then he was nominated for a 2010 season rookie.

Achievements 

Red Bull Air Race

Legend: * CAN: Cancelled * DNP: Did not take part * DNS: Did not start * DSQ: Disqualified

2009
World Championship, Unlimited - Free Style, Powered, 9th place
Slovenian Nationals, Unlimited, Powered, 1st place
World Air Games, Unlimited, Powered, 5th place

2008
World Aerobatic Cup, Unlimited, Powered, 3rd place 
European Championship, Unlimited, Powered, 17th place
National Championship, Unlimited, Powered, 1st place

2007
World Championship, Unlimited, Powered, 29th place.
National Championship, Unlimited, Powered, 2nd place

2006
European Championship, Unlimited, Powered, 14th place
National Championship, Unlimited, Powered, 3rd place

2005
European Championship, Advanced, Powered, 14th place
National Championship, Advanced, Powered, 4th place

2004
National Championship, Sportsman, Powered, 1st place
National Championship, Intermediate, Gliders, 1st place

2003
National Championship, Sportsman, Gliders, 1st place

2002
National Championship, Sportsman, Gliders, 3rd place

Gallery

References

External links 

 Official website
 Red Bull Air Race Pilot Profile – Martin Šonka

Aerobatic pilots
Czech aviators
Czech air racers
Red Bull Air Race World Championship pilots
Living people
1978 births
People from Dvůr Králové nad Labem
Sportspeople from the Hradec Králové Region